Finally Famous Vol. 3: Big is the third mixtape by American rapper Big Sean. It was released as a free online download on August 31, 2010, by Kanye West's label GOOD Music. The production was handled from Sean himself, alongside his boss and label-mate Kanye West, Clinton Sparks and No I.D.; as well as the guest appearances from Bun B, Big K.R.I.T., YG, Drake, Asher Roth, Mike Posner, Tyga and Currensy, among others.

The album's lyrical content largely deals with Sean's history and his recent fame, with the focus mainly being on his burgeoning music career. On January 3, 2011, the mixtape was re-released through GOOD music's official blog, where it included these three additional reissued tracks, and the tape has been lacking the Don Cannon's voice-overs; as well as the bonus track, which features Kanye West.

Promotion
The videos were shot for the songs such as "Too Fake" featuring Chiddy Bang, "What U Doin' (Bullshittin')", "Ambiguous" featuring Mike Posner and Clinton Sparks, "Crazy", "Supa Dupa Lemonade", "Hometown", "Final Hour", "Made" featuring Drake, and "High Rise".

Track listing
The track listing was confirmed by XXL.

Notes
 The tracks 18, 19 and 20 are the additional tracks for the re-released version.
 On the original release, the tape had one untitled bonus track featuring Kanye West. This song was later revealed to be called "Glenwood".

Sample credits
 "Five Bucks" contains a sample of "I Got 5 On It" performed by Luniz.
 "Supa Dupa Lemonade" contains a sample of "Lemonade" performed by Gucci Mane.
 "Too Fake" contains a sample of "Too Fake" performed by Hockey.
 "My Closet" contains a sample of "Your Song" performed by Ellie Goulding.
 "Hometown" contains a sample of "Hometown Glory" performed by Adele.

References

2010 mixtape albums
Albums produced by Kanye West
Albums produced by No I.D.
Big Sean albums
Albums produced by Key Wane
Sequel albums
Albums produced by Metro Boomin
Albums produced by Bangladesh (record producer)
Albums produced by Don Cannon
Albums produced by Chuck Inglish